Yuri Grigorievich Shatalov (Russian: Ю́рий Григо́рьевич Шата́лов; June 13, 1945 – March 20, 2018) was a Russian ice hockey player who played in the Soviet Hockey League.  He played for Krylya Sovetov Moscow.  He was inducted into the Russian and Soviet Hockey Hall of Fame in 1974.

References

External links

 Russian and Soviet Hockey Hall of Fame bio

1945 births
2018 deaths
Avangard Omsk players
Burials in Troyekurovskoye Cemetery
Krylya Sovetov Moscow players
HC Lada Togliatti players
HC CSKA Moscow players
Honoured Masters of Sport of the USSR
Soviet ice hockey defencemen
Sportspeople from Omsk